Vlasiḱi is an abandoned village in the municipality of Centar Župa, North Macedonia. The settlement of Vlasiḱi was once a neighborhood of the nearby village of Balanci.

Demographics
In the late Ottoman period, Vlasiḱi was traditionally inhabited by an Orthodox Macedonian and Muslim Macedonian (Torbeš) population. In the twentieth century, the village when inhabited  had Albanians living in Vlasiḱi.

According to the 2002 census, the village had a total of 0 inhabitants.

References

Villages in Centar Župa Municipality
Albanian communities in North Macedonia